The 1888 South Carolina gubernatorial election was held on November 6, 1888 to select the governor of the state of South Carolina. John Peter Richardson III was renominated by the Democrats and was reelected for a second two-year term.

Democratic Convention

In 1886, an amendment was added to the constitution of the South Carolina Democratic Party that mandated candidates for Governor and Lieutenant Governor to have at least one meeting in every congressional district with the voters. Benjamin Tillman, an upstate demagogue, engaged Governor Richardson at the meetings in 1888 and soundly trounced him on the stump.

Confident of his support in the state, Tillman sought to name the next governor of South Carolina and told his henchmen to nominate Joseph H. Earle at the Democratic convention. Earle refused the nomination, but Tillman's men nominated him nevertheless stating that "This is a case of the office seeking the man, and not the man seeking the office." A friend of Earle's from Sumter County rose to withdraw his name and Earle's brother declared that Earle would not serve if elected. However, many delegates still voted for Earle and Tillman's growing strength in the Democratic party became evident when his candidate for governor obtained almost 40% of the vote, despite publicly disavowing any candidacy.

General election
The general election was held on November 6, 1888 and John Peter Richardson III was reelected as governor of South Carolina without opposition. There were very few contested races  and turnout increased for this election over the previous election solely because of a presidential election on the ballot.

 

|-
| 
| colspan=5 |Democratic hold
|-

See also
Governor of South Carolina
List of governors of South Carolina
South Carolina gubernatorial elections

Notes

References

"Supplemental Report of the Secretary of State to the General Assembly of South Carolina." Reports and Resolutions of the General Assembly of the State of South Carolina. Volume I. Columbia, SC: James H. Woodrow, 1889, p. 569.

External links
SCIway Biography of Governor John Peter Richardson III

South Carolina
1888
Gubernatorial
November 1888 events